Pang is a Chinese surname. It is romanized Pong in Cantonese. In  Vietnam, this surname is written in Quốc Ngữ as Bàng. "Pang" is also the Cantonese romanization of another Chinese surname Peng.

Origins
There are four commonly cited origins to the Pang surname. They are:
The Pang surname originates from the surname Ji (姬), the ancestral name of the Zhou dynasty. Descendants of King Wen of Zhou became the rulers of the vassal state Pang, located in today's Nanyang.
Ji Gao (姬高), the first Duke of Bi, bestowed upon one of his sons as the Master of Pang village (庞乡大夫). From the start of Pang Village in the early years of the Zhou dynasty to the later years of the spring and autumn period, Pang village (庞乡) grew from a village to a State (庞国). The Master of Pang became so influential that the King of Zhou made him the Duke of Pang. The Duke of Pang during the late spring and autumn period crowned himself King Gaozu of Pang. Pang Gaozu ruled for only several years until his realm was eventually conquered by Wei during the late spring and autumn period. The descendants of the Royal Family of Pang came to retain the surname of Pang, some even moved to as far as Hainan during the Ming Dynasty, one of which was a famous Ming General.
The Pang surname originates from the surname Gaoyang (高揚), that of the mythological emperor Zhuanxu.
A wealthy family around Xiangyang took the surname Pang, due to it having the meaning of grand or large.
A noble family name in Ancient China, first granted to a country's benefactor and royal relative by the Empire during the Zhou dynasty. Meaning, Dragons roar from the High Palace of the South Sea. High Palace, a grand mansion surrounded by constant rapids. A person bearing traits associated with Pang including virtue, grand, power and strength, intelligence, or an affinity for dragons. 
A small fraction of Chinese ethnic minorities have the Pang surname. They include the Manchu, the Tujia, the Yao, the Qiang, and the Mongols.

Character
The Pang character, with Long (Chinese: dragon) character in the centre, the two strokes outside is the shape of shrine, illustrating worship of dragon god. As surname, it is generally known as the House of Dragon or Dragon God.

Phono-semantic compound (形聲, OC *broːŋ): semantic 广 (“house”) + phonetic 龍 ("dragon") (OC *b·roŋ, *mroːŋ).

The character later also used as an adjective with meaning of huge; enormous; tremendous.

Notable people with surnamed Pang (龐) 

Persons with surname "Pang" (龐) include:
 Pang Bingxun (龐炳勛; Wade–Giles: Pang Ping-hsun (1879-1963), military general during the Second Sino-Japanese War
 Pang De (龐德; died 219), general serving under various warlords in the late Eastern Han dynasty
 Pang Juan (龐涓; died 342 BC), military general from the Warring States Period
 Pang Yun Jushi (龐蘊居士; 740–808), Zen Buddhist
 May Pang (龐鳳儀, born 1950), American personal assistant and production coordinator for John Lennon and Yoko Ono.
 Pang Wanchun (龐萬春), fictional character in the novel Water Margin
 Pang Tong (龐統; 179–214), adviser to the Eastern Han dynasty warlord Liu Bei
 Pang Xi (龐羲), official serving under the Eastern Han dynasty warlord Liu Zhang
Pang Shigu (died 897), general serving under the warlord Zhu Wen
Pang Chien-kuo (龐建國; 1953–2022), Taiwanese politician.

See also
 List of common Chinese surnames
 龐 Wiktionary
 Peng (surname)
 Penck (surname)

References

Chinese-language surnames
Individual Chinese surnames